Love Cosmetics (1969–1980) was introduced by Menley & James Laboratories on March 1, 1969. By the summer of 1970, the company was marketing and promoting Fresh Lemon bath products and Soft Eyes items to beautify the eyes. Advertising was coordinated by Wells, Rich, Greene advertising agency (1967–1990), a company founded by Mary Wells Lawrence. Love's advertising budget surpassed $7 million. There was an emphasis on a long-term building operation, with advertisements on television and
in women's magazines. A 4-page spread appeared in the February 1969 Harper's Bazaar. The headline theme was This is the way Love is in 1969. The opening continued with Love today is different than it's ever been. It's freer, more natural, more honest-more out in the open. So are the girls who fall in love these days. Singer Andy Williams hosted a mid-March 1969 Andy Williams Love Special. Love Cosmetics is credited with introducing the lemon craze.

Ownership

M&J was composed of Philadelphia, Pennsylvania lawyers, doctors, and marketing men. It was a subsidiary of SmithKline & French Laboratories. SmithKline & French made Thorazine, Compazine, Dexedrine, Eskatrol, and most notably, Contac. M&J was sometimes criticized for concentrating its marketing in drug stores. However, it felt that such a basic strategy would enable it to best take advantage of its
capabilities.<ref name=first>Advertising: Menley Signs Up Della Femina, New York Times, August 21, 1970, Page 57.</ref>

Product line

The ideal customer on which marketing focused was a young woman, 20 to 25. She might be a young businesswoman, co-ed, or young married. She was likely a trend setter and a heavy cosmetics user. Love Cosmetics' first line of items
included Love's Fresh Lemon Cleanser, Lovelids eyeshadow, and Eau De Love. In all, there were eleven products, and with the inclusion of shades, they numbered forty-three.

Loveshines was the fun stick to contour and color your eyes, face, all your other kissable little curves and hollows. Lipsticks were called Lovesticks. The remainder of the line was Love's Basic Moisture, Love's A Little Color, Love's Transparent Powder, Love's A Little Cover, Love's Liner, Love's Mascara, and Lovelids. The latter was an eyeshadow with a container in the shape of a plastic eyeball. The company believed that eyeshadows for the day should be in neutral shades, specifically taupe, russet, heather, or olive green. Nighttime was more suited for deeper, yet not brighter colors, especially purple, plum, or teal. In early 1976, Love Cosmetics started marketing Purple Sage, Tumbleweed, and Prairie Dawn eyeshadow shades.

In April 1974, Love Cosmetics began to make a line of Baby Soft products meant for adults. The items were scented with an innocent fragrance most often associated with babies. There was a Baby soft talc, a body lotion, and a foam bath. A marketing slogan read sexy in a very special way.'' Baby Soft products were priced from $2 to $2.75. 1975 was a busy year in the cosmetics industry with the introduction of many fragrances by competing firms. Love Cosmetics' new scent was called Daisy L.

Advertising

Peter Godfrey, president of Menley & James, announced in May 1976 that he was seeking a smaller advertising firm to replace Wells, Rich, Green. The parting was friendly but necessary because of the growth of Wells Lawrence's firm. It had become too large for it to give Love Cosmetics' account the attention it required. Wells, Rich, Green began to represent Max Factor of Los Angeles, California in April 1977. Altman, Stoller, Weiss represented Love Cosmetics for two years before M&J switched to the Jan Zwiren Agency of Chicago, Illinois. Zwiren was formerly vice president of the consumer products division of Helene Curtis Industries. Prior to this she worked with M&J in promoting Love Cosmetics. In BC Canada, Peter Rose was "the Man from Love!" producing by far the largest sales per account in North America. The SFM Media Service Corporation continued to coordinate media planning and buying for the Love Cosmetics line.

Buyout

In May 1980 Menley & James entered into an agreement with Chattem of Chattanooga, Tennessee, to purchase its Love Cosmetics business. Terms were not revealed.

References

External links
Love Cosmetics 1973 Advertisement at YouTube
Mary Wells Lawrence at Cladvertising.org

Cosmetics companies of the United States
Companies based in Philadelphia
History of cosmetics
Retail companies established in 1969
1970s fashion
Defunct companies based in Pennsylvania
1969 establishments in Pennsylvania
Retail companies disestablished in 1980
1980 disestablishments in Pennsylvania
1980 mergers and acquisitions